K 6 is a  sailboat class designed by Einar Ohlson and built in about 50 copies.

History
The K 6 designed by Einar Ohlson was the winner of a design competition held by Svenska Kosterbåtsförbundet.

References

1940s sailboat type designs
Sailboat type designs by Swedish designers
Keelboats